Patricia Reilly Hitt (January 24, 1918 – January 9, 2006) was the Assistant Secretary of Health, Education and Welfare under President Richard Nixon. 

Hitt was born in Taft, California but grew up in Whittier, California, attending Whittier High School.

In 1972, she was awarded an honorary Doctor of Laws (LL.D.) degree from Whittier College.

She died of natural causes on January 9, 2006, at her home in Balboa Island.  Hitt was 87 years old.  It was noted that she had died on the date that would have been the late president's 93rd birthday. She was the highest-ranking woman in Nixon's first administration.

References

1918 births
2006 deaths
People from Taft, California
People from Whittier, California
Nixon administration personnel

External links 

 Patricia Hitt at her Villa Park home, 1964, in the Los Angeles Times Photographic Archive (Collection 1429). UCLA Library Special Collections, Charles E. Young Research Library, University of California, Los Angeles.